Achema Power Plant is a natural gas-fired power plant in Jonava, Lithuania. Its primary use is to serve Achema factory.

The first cogeneration power plant was built in 2006, second in 2011. As of 2014 Achema Power Plant had installed capacity of 75 MW.

References

Energy infrastructure completed in 2006
Natural gas-fired power stations in Lithuania
Buildings and structures in Jonava
Economy of Jonava